

Æthelweald (or Æthelwald) was a medieval Bishop of Dunwich.

Æthelweald was consecrated between 845 and 870, but his death date is unknown. After Æthelweald, there was an interruption with the episcopal succession through Danish Viking invasions in the late 9th and early 10th centuries. By the mid-10th century, Dunwich had been united to the see of Elmham.

References

External links
 

Bishops of Dunwich (ancient)